Jeff Marchelletta is an American actor, and film producer.

Biography
Jeff Marchelletta was born and raised in Long Island, NY.  Before becoming an actor, Marchelletta was an executive at one of the USA's largest building contractors. After a modeling stint with Gianni Versace Marchelletta studied acting in  NYC and LA and landed his first acting role as a recurring character on the American soap opera All My Children.
In 2002, Marchelletta received a Best Actor Nomination at the 2002 Modesto Film Festival for the film Hollywood Vampyr starring Muse Watson and Trevor Goddard.  Marchelletta produced Ringers: Lord of the Fans. Ringers: Lord of the Fans received a 2006 Saturn Award nomination and won the "Outstanding Achievement Award in Filmmaking" at the 2005 Newport Beach Film Festival.

Filmography

Film

Television

Producer
Without (film), 2011

Ringers: Lord of the Fans, 2005

Interviews & Articles
Voyage ATL: Life & Work with Jeff Marchelletta of Midtown Atlanta
Shoutout LA: Meet Jeff Marchelletta Actor, Producer & VP
Jezebel Magazine Tweet Elite
The Hollywood Reporter
Marchelletta talks to Advocate about Ringers
TheOneRing.net
Interview about Hollywood Vampyr

References

External links
 Jeff Marchelletta Website

Year of birth missing (living people)
Living people